John Morgan (fl. 1563) was a Welsh politician.

He was a Member (MP) of the Parliament of England for Carmarthen Boroughs in 1563.

References

Year of birth missing
Year of death missing
16th-century Welsh politicians
Members of the Parliament of England (pre-1707) for constituencies in Wales
English MPs 1563–1567